La Negra, Spanish for The Black Woman, may refer to:

People
 La Negra Carlota (died 1844), enslaved Cuban woman and rebel leader
 Caridad la Negra (1879–1960), Spanish prostitute and madam
Isabel la Negra (died 1974), Puerto-Rican brothel owner
Arminda Aberastury (1910–1972), Argentine psychoanalyst
Toña la Negra (1912–1982), Mexican singer and actress
 Mercedes Sosa (1935–2009), Argentine singer
Antonia La Negra (c. 1935–2018), Spanish cantaora and bailaora
 Amanda Peralta (1939–2009), Argentine guerrilla and historian in Sweden
Amara La Negra (born 1990), American singer and entertainer

Places
 La Negra (industrial complex), an industrial complex and village near Antofagasta, Chile
 Sierra Negra, an extinct volcano in the state of Puebla, Mexico

Other uses
 "El Son de la Negra", a famous Mexican folk song in the son jaliscense style
 La Negra Formation, a geological formation in Chile
 La Negrada, a 2018 Mexican film
 La Négresse (1952–53), by Henri Matisse